Lexipedia is an online visual semantic network with dictionary and thesaurus reference functionality built on Vantage Learning's Multilingual ConceptNet. Lexipedia presents words with their semantic relationships displayed in an animated visual word web. Lexipedia contains an expanded version of the English Wordnet and supports six languages; English, Dutch, French, German, Italian, Spanish languages.

References

External links
 Lexipedia – Where words have meaning
 Vantage Learning
 Centre for Computational Linguistics (CCL)

Online dictionaries
Thesauri